Union Trust Bank (UTB), whose full name is Union Trust Bank Limited, is a commercial bank in Sierra Leone. It is licensed as a "commercial bank" by the Bank of Sierra Leone, the central bank and national banking regulator.

Overview
The bank, according to its website, is the only privately owned indigenous commercial bank in the country, as of May 2017. , the bank's total assets were valued at SLL:361.817 billion (approximately US$48.6 million), with shareholders' equity of SLL: 58.162 billion (approximately US$7.811 million).

History
UTB was founded in 1995 by Sierra Leonean individuals and corporations and was registered as a limited liability company. It began offering banking services following the issuance of a commercial banking license by the Bank of Sierra Leone. On 17 March 2017, the bank celebrated the opening of its headquarters building, on Howe Street, in Freetown, performed by Ernest Bai Koroma the president of Sierra Leone.

Branch Network
, UTB maintains branches at the following locations:

(1) Main Branch - Lightfoot-Boston Street, Freetown
(2) Njala University Branch - Njala University, Mokonde Campus, Moyamba District
(3) Kenema Branch - 19 Hangha Road, Kenema, Eastern Province
(4) Bo Branch - 7 Bojon Street, Bo, Southern Province
(5) Kono Branch - 5 Old Yengema Road, Koidu, Kono District
(6) Kambia Branch - Sierra Leone-Guinea Highway, Kambia
(7) Lumley Branch - Lumley Road, Freetown
(8) Kissy Branch - 49 Baibureh Road, Kissy, Freetown
(9) Magburaka Branch - Kono Makeni Highway, Magburaka
(10) Liverpool Street Branch - Liverpool Street, Freetown
(11) Brookfields Branch - Main Motor Road, Freetown
(12) New England Ville Branch - Jomo Kenyatta Road, Freetown
(13) Lunsar Branch - Lunsar
(14) Yoni Branch - Mile 91, Freetown Bo Highway

See also
 List of banks in Sierra Leone
 List of banks in Africa
 Economy of Sierra Leone
 Bank of Sierra Leone

References

External links
  Website of Union Trust Bank
 Website of Bank of Sierra Leone
 UTB Celebrates Doubling Its Profit In 2010

Banks of Sierra Leone
Banks established in 1995
1995 establishments in Sierra Leone
Companies based in Freetown